József Schaller (17 December 1894 – 1927) was a Hungarian footballer.

He played with Újpest FC in the Hungarian championship and in 1924 he moved abroad to Yugoslavia and joined KAFK Kula.  While playing with KAFK he played for the team of Subotica Football Subassociation in the 1924 Yugoslav Cup.  By 1926 he was back in Hungary playing with Újpest FC.

He made 3 appearances for the Hungarian national team between 1919 and 1922.

He died in a motorcycle accident in 1927.

References

1894 births
1927 deaths
Hungarian footballers
Hungary international footballers
Hungarian expatriate footballers
Association football forwards
Újpest FC players
FK Hajduk Kula players
Expatriate footballers in Yugoslavia
Hungarian expatriate sportspeople in Yugoslavia